Muhammad Raza Saqib Mustafai (born 16 March 1972) is a Pakistani Islamic preacher and scholar. He is the founder of Idara-tul-Mustafa.

Personal life
Mustafai is married to Umm-e-Hamza.

Career
He is founder of Muhammad Raza Saqib Mustafai Foundation. He is a follower of the Naqshbandi Sufi order and supports the sufi practices of Mawlid (Prophet’s Birthday), Urs (commemoration of a saint) and Bay'ah (an oath of loyalty to a sheikh).
In November 2018, he performed the marriage ceremony of the Pakistan Army chief Qamar Javed Bajwa's son, Saad Bajwa, in Lahore.

References

Living people
1972 births
Pakistani Islamic religious leaders
Pakistani Islamists
Muslim missionaries
Pakistani Sunni Muslim scholars of Islam
Barelvis
People from Gujranwala District
Pakistani YouTubers